Qiu Haitao (born August 15, 1973) is a female Chinese softball player. She competed in the 2000 Summer Olympics finishing fourth. She played three matches.

References

1973 births
Living people
Chinese softball players
Olympic softball players of China
Softball players at the 2000 Summer Olympics